Anthony Edwards may refer to:

Sports
 Anthony Edwards (American football) (born 1966), American football wide receiver
 Anthony Edwards (basketball) (born 2001), American basketball player
 Antony Edwards (1910–1978), English cricketer
 Anthony Edwards (rower) (born 1972), Australian Olympic rower

Others
 Anthony Edwards (actor) (born 1962), American actor and director
 Anthony Stockwell Garfield Edwards or A. S. G. Edwards (born 1942), American scholar of medieval literature and manuscripts
 Anthony William Fairbank Edwards or A. W. F. Edwards (born 1935), British geneticist and statistician
 Tony Edwards (born 1944), Australian comic book artist and illustrator

See also 
 Edwards (surname)